Teach-In was a Dutch band, best known for winning Eurovision Song Contest 1975 with the song "Ding-a-dong". The band was founded in 1967 and parted in 1980. Throughout this time there were several changes in line-up.

History
The group was formed in 1967 in Enschede. The first lineup: Hilda Felix (vocals), Henk Westendorp (vocals, later in Superfly), John Snuverink (vocals, guitar), Frans Schaddelee (bass), leader Koos Versteeg (vocals & keys) and Rudi Nijhuis (drums).

In 1971, only Koos and Rudi remained in the group, and the rest of the band comprised Getty Kaspers (vocals, in 1976 solo as Getty), John Gaasbeek (bass, already in 1964 in the Stora Combo (later known as Orkest Freddie Golden, he also left in 1976), Chris De Wolde (guitar) and Ard Weenink (also until 1976). A recording contract was signed with CNR Records and Eddy Ouwens became their producer and co-composer.

Their first single was "Spoke the Lord Creator" (originally a song by Focus), released in 1972, which didn't chart.

In 1974 the band had three top 15 hits in the Netherlands: "Fly Away", "In the Summernight" (which even did reach number 5 in a South African charts) and "Tennessee Town".

In March 1975, Teach-In participated in the Eurovision Song Contest 1975 with the song "Ding-a-dong" (written by Will Luikinga and Eddy Ouwens) and won. Teach-In broke an Eurovision convention that favours songs performing later in the program by winning the contest despite performing first. This was a first for the competition and was repeated a year later by Brotherhood of Man in the 1976 Eurovision Contest. This feat has only been repeated by one further act; the Herreys in 1984. "Ding-a-Dong" had a chart entry in nearly every European country, as well as a number 22 placing in the USA on the Easy Listening chart. In the Netherlands it reached number 3 in the charts. In October 1975 "Goodbye Love" became another Dutch top 10-hit. "Rose Valley", released in February 1976, reached just the top 20. Tensions due to the busy concert scheme made Getty Kaspers leave the band, after which she pursued a solo career. Also John Gaasbeek and Ard Weenink quit. Hans Nijland (bass, in 1977 replaced by Nick De Vos), Betty Vermeulen (vocals), Marianne Wolsink (vocals, ex-Head) were included as new members. The group's next single "Upside Down" reached number 2 in the Netherlands.

In 1978 the Disco rage nearly destroyed Teach-In's popularity. A new look and sound had to be adopted and "Dear John" became a top 10 hit in October. In 1979 a theme song for a Dutch TV charity show supporting Greenpeace hit the top 10. 1980's single "Regrets" proved to be the group's swan song as the group disbanded soon after.

In 1997, news came that the original line up (with Getty Kaspers) had re-recorded some of their old hits and had plans to tour again.

In June 1979, two ex-members of the group, Getty and John Gaasbeek, joined by Wilma van Diepen, formed the Balloon trio. Later on, Getty tried a new solo career, recording a couple of discs including the Getty Album (features De Eerste Liefde is Een Feest with lyrics in Dutch, originally När du tar mig i din famn/The Queen of Hearts by Agnetha Fältskog in Swedish and English). Her vocals can also be heard on Rick van der Linden's Cum Laude album and on recordings made by Radio Veronica.

The band reunited to sing "Ding-a-Dong" at a show in Maastricht on 31 August 2007.

The band reunited to perform at the final of the Eurovision Song Contest 2021 as an interval act.

Discography

Studio albums

Compilation albums

Singles

Notes

References

External links

Dutch pop music groups
Eurovision Song Contest entrants for the Netherlands
Eurovision Song Contest entrants of 1975
Eurovision Song Contest winners
Musical groups established in 1969
Musical groups disestablished in 1980
Nationaal Songfestival contestants